Charles Eastman "Chuck" Jones (born January 16, 1971) is an American former politician. He served in the South Dakota Senate from 2013 to 2014.

References

1971 births
Living people
People from Flandreau, South Dakota
Republican Party South Dakota state senators